Japan participated at the 2017 Summer Universiade, in Taipei, Taiwan.

Medal summary

Medal by sports

Medalists

Demonstration

References

 Japan Overview

External links
Universiade Taipei 2017 

Nations at the 2017 Summer Universiade
Japan at the Summer Universiade
2017 in Japanese sport